Chota K. Naidu (born 1962) is an Indian cinematographer, best known for his distinct style of cinematography for films like, Matru Devo Bhava, Choodalani Vundi, and Kotha Bangaru Lokam. Naidu is part of the Indian Society of Cinematographers, the South Indian Cinematographers Association and the Telugu Cinematographers Association. He received two state Nandi Awards for Anji, Kotha Bangaru Lokam and two Filmfare Awards South for Kotha Bangaru Lokam, Damarukam for his cinematography. His outstanding contribution to the Indian Film Industry and the Indian Television Industry working as a DOP for Telugu, Tamil and Hindi films, and in television  is appreciated from last 30 and odd years.

Early life
Naidu was born in Ramachandrapuram, East Godavari district, Andhra Pradesh. His father, Chitti Babu Naidu, is a writer and director of stage plays at Andhra Pradesh, and his mother, Ananthalakshmi, is a housewife. His elder sister, Padma Latha, is an electronics engineer and his elder brother, K.V.S. Naidu, is a mechanical engineer. His younger sister, Kanaka Durga, is an electronics engineer, and his younger brother, Shyam K. Naidu, is a cinematographer. He attended Skpgn Govt. Junior College Rcpuram. Born into a family of engineers, Chota spent most of his time watching films instead of concentrating on his studies and, due to this, he failed in his 10th standard exams. As a way to widen his exposure to films, he worked as a gatekeeper in a nearby theatre. He failed in his supplementary exams later that year because he was increasingly watching more films. Realizing his interest in cinema, his father Chitti Babu Naidu challenged him to pass at least 10th standard, and thereby, if he's successful, his father will employ him in the film industry. Chota took the challenge and passed with good rank and, as promised, his father made him a camera apprentice at Devar Films outdoor unit, which is a camera rental house in the city of Chennai in 1979. Later, he joined Taraka Prabhu outdoor unit under Dasari Narayana Rao. 
He was working with top cinematographers during the 1980s throughout India as a focus puller. He was inspired by DOP (Director of Photography) V.S.R. Swamy for his discipline, dedication and craft. He considers Swamy as his role model.

Career

Naidu's first opportunity as a DOP was for the telefilm Kristhu Jananam (1987) for DD Hyderabad Kendra which was directed by Bharath Parepalli and produced by P. Seetha Devi, who later went on to become his wife.
 
From then onwards, he was continuously working for more regional and national television work and TV commercials, evolving his craftsmanship in the process.

Naidu's first movie as a cinematographer was Dasari Narayana Rao Amma Rajinama(1991). He collaborated with Dasari Narayana Rao for several other films such as Venkanna Babu, Surigadu, and Santaan. Some of the directors he collaborated with are E.V.V. Satyanarayana, for the films Varasudu, Maga Rayudu, Veedevadandi Babu and Maavidaakulu, Kranthi Kumar for Bhale Pellam, K. Raghavendra Rao for Allari Premikudu, Bombay Priyudu and Gangotri, Ramgopal Varma for Deyyam, Suresh Krissna for Master, Daddy, and Baba (Tamil), Satish Kaushik for Prem (Hindi), Gunasekhar for Choodalani Vundi, David Dhawan for Kunwara (Hindi), A.R. Murugadoss for Stalin, Trivikram Srinivas for Julai, and with V.V. Vinayak for Tagore, Bunny, Lakshmi, Krishna, Adhurs, Naayak and Alludu Seenu.

Style 

Naidu received critical acclaim with his debut Kristhu Jananam, a telefilm dealing with the times of Jesus Christ, for the rich painting-like cinematography.

For Matru Devo Bhava, Naidu applied the chiaroscuro (extremely bright back light and top light to the point of burnout) and silhouette techniques to communicate predominantly a tragic content.

Varasudu was his first big commercial film. In the film, he adopted a commercial style of lighting and a fitting selection of the color palette to portray grandeur.

Personal life
His nephew Sundeep Kishan is a film actor.

Filmography

Television
 Appuchesi Pappukudu (DD Saptagiri)

See also
 Indian cinematographers

References

External links
 

Telugu film cinematographers
Telugu people
Living people
Cinematographers from Andhra Pradesh
Nandi Award winners
Filmfare Awards South winners
21st-century Indian photographers
1962 births